Likymnios of Chios was an ancient Greek dithyrambic poet from Chios, probably born in the fourth century BC although this is not certain.

Aristotle mentions him in his "Rhetoric", saying that Likymnios' works were as good in written form as spoken or better. He is also mentioned by Chaeremon of Alexandria. One of his poems, a prayer for health, was preserved by Sextus Empiricus, although the attribution is uncertain and it might be by another poet.

Notes

References 
 
 Smith, William, Dictionary of Greek and Roman Biography and Mythology, London (1873). Online version at the Perseus Digital Library.

Dithyrambic poets
Ancient Chians
Ancient Greek poets
4th-century BC Greek people